The 2011 Open GDF Suez de Cagnes-sur-Mer Alpes-Maritimes was a professional tennis tournament played on clay courts. It was part of the 2011 ITF Women's Circuit. It took place in Cagnes-sur-Mer, France between 2 and 9 May 2011.

Singles entrants

Seeds

 Rankings are as of April 25, 2010.

Other entrants
The following players received wildcards into the singles main draw:
  Stéphanie Foretz Gacon 
  Caroline Garcia 
  Kristina Mladenovic 
  Olivia Sanchez

The following players received entry from the qualifying draw:
  Lara Arruabarrena-Vecino
  Mona Barthel
  Andreja Klepač
  Valeria Savinykh

Champions

Singles

 Sorana Cîrstea def.  Pauline Parmentier, 6–7(5), 6–2, 6–2

Doubles

 Anna-Lena Grönefeld /  Petra Martić def.  Darija Jurak /  Renata Voráčová, 1–6, 6–2, [11–9]

External links

Official Website
ITF Search

2011 ITF Women's Circuit
2011
May 2011 sports events in France
2011 in French tennis